Arab Uruguayans, are Uruguayan of Arab ethnic, citizens or residents whose ancestry traces back to any of various waves of immigrants from the Arab world, Mostly from Lebanon and Syria.

Overview
Arab Uruguayans originated mainly from what is now Lebanon (of which there may be over 50,000 descendants). There are also individuals from other Arab countries such as Egypt, Syria, Morocco and Palestine.

Most Uruguayans of Arabic descent are Christians, with some Muslim minorities. There was also a small influx of Arab Jews, who have since lost their Arab cultural identity.

Arab Uruguayans are among the smallest Arab diaspora groups in the world. There are some 500 Arab-speaking people in the border towns of Chuy and Rivera.

Lately there are two noticeable trends:
 Syrian refugees who flee from the Syrian Civil War,
 Arab investors interested in Uruguay, who created the Uruguayan-Arab Chamber (in cooperation with the Gulf Cooperation Council).

Notable people 
 Alberto Abdala, Vice President of Uruguay 1967-1972, of Lebanese descent
 Washington Abdala, lawyer and politician, President of the Chamber of Deputies (2000), of Lebanese descent
 Hebert Abimorad, journalist and poet of Lebanese descent
 Matías Abisab, footballer
 Alejandro Apud, football manager
 Cacho de la Cruz, entertainer, of Moroccan descent
 Amir Hamed, writer and translator, of Syrian descent
 Jorge Nasser, musician, of Lebanese descent
 Amin Niffouri, politician, of Syrian descent

See also

Lebanese Uruguayans
Palestinian Uruguayans
Syrians in Uruguay

References

 
Ethnic groups in Uruguay
 
Immigration to Uruguay
Arab diaspora in South America